Pilton is a hamlet and civil parish in North Northamptonshire, England. The population is included in the civil parish of Wadenhoe.

The hamlets name means 'Pileca's farm/settlement'.

References

Villages in Northamptonshire
North Northamptonshire
Civil parishes in Northamptonshire